Thiosulfate sulfurtransferase is an enzyme that in humans is encoded by the TST gene.

The product of this gene is a mitochondrial matrix enzyme that is encoded by the nucleus. It may play roles in cyanide detoxification, the formation of iron-sulfur proteins, and the modification of sulfur-containing enzymes.

The gene product contains two highly conservative domains (rhodanese homology domains), suggesting these domains have a common evolutionary origin.

References

Further reading